Chan Yung-jan and Chuang Chia-jung were the defending champions, but Chan decided not to participate that year.

Chuang successfully defended her title alongside Chang Kai-chen, defeating Hsieh Su-wei and Sania Mirza 6–4, 6–2 in the final.

Seeds

Draw

Draw

References
 http://itftennis.com/procircuit/tournaments/women's-tournament/info.aspx?tournamentid=1100022997

OEC Taipei Ladies Open - Doubles
Taipei WTA Ladies Open